Shikoku Eighty 8 Queen is a women's volleyball team based in Takamatsu, Kagawa, Shikoku District, Japan. It plays in V.Challenge League. The club was founded in 2005). It is operated by NPO J-HOT Volleyball Federation.
General Manager and head coach is Kazunori Yoneda who was the former head coach of women's volleyball national team of Japan.

History
It was founded in 2005.
It promoted to V.Challenge League in 2007.
In October 2008, Two players are rental transferred for the register from Denso Airybees in order to reinforce strength.
On July 1, 2011, the team has suspended the activities because lack of funds.
In August 2011, the team resumed and moved to Sendai, and so renamed as Sendai Belle Fille.

League results

Current squad
As of June 2011
 1    Junko Takahashi
 3    Orie Haga
 4    Mieko Uchihara
 5    Minako Nakajima
 10  Mai Uemura
 12  Suzue Inui
 13  Sakika Osuga
 14  Ya Chen Wang
 15  Saori Kimura (1988birth)

Former players
  Akina Ida (-2009)
  Nanami Inoue (2008–09)
  Naoko Takahashi (2008–09)
  Rie Sasazaki
  Natsumi Oka
  Aya Matsuda

References

External links
 Official Website
 V.League(Japan) Official Website

Japanese volleyball teams
Sports teams in Kagawa Prefecture
2005 establishments in Japan
Volleyball clubs established in 2005